Dominique Scali is a Canadian novelist and journalist from Quebec. She was a shortlisted finalist for the Governor General's Award for French-language fiction at the 2015 Governor General's Awards for her debut novel À la recherche de New Babylon, and W. Donald Wilson was shortlisted for the Governor General's Award for French to English translation at the 2017 Governor General's Awards for the novel's English translation In Search of New Babylon.

As a journalist, she works for Le Journal de Montréal. Her most recent novel is Les marins ne savent pas nager (2022).

References

Canadian women non-fiction writers
Canadian women novelists
Canadian newspaper journalists
Canadian women journalists
Canadian novelists in French
Journalists from Montreal
Writers from Montreal
French Quebecers
Living people
21st-century Canadian women writers
21st-century Canadian novelists
21st-century Canadian journalists
Year of birth missing (living people)